Minaki railway station is located in the community of Minaki in Unorganized Kenora District in northwestern Ontario, Canada. The station is on the Canadian National Railway transcontinental main line, and is in use by Via Rail as a stop for transcontinental Canadian trains.

The station was designated under the Heritage Railway Stations Protection Act in 2011. The designation notes it was built in 1910 by the National Transcontinental Railway.

References

External links
 Minaki railway station

Via Rail stations in Ontario
Railway stations in Kenora District
Designated heritage railway stations in Ontario
Canadian National Railway stations in Ontario